Damien Ravu (born 3 May 1994) is a Papua New Guinean cricketer. He made his first-class debut for Papua New Guinea in the 2015–17 ICC Intercontinental Cup on 1 October 2017. He made his One Day International (ODI) debut for Papua New Guinea against Scotland on 25 November 2017.

In August 2018, he was named in Papua New Guinea's squad for Group A of the 2018–19 ICC World Twenty20 East Asia-Pacific Qualifier tournament.

In March 2019, he was named in Papua New Guinea's squad for the Regional Finals of the 2018–19 ICC World Twenty20 East Asia-Pacific Qualifier tournament. He made his Twenty20 International (T20I) debut for Papua New Guinea against the Philippines on 22 March 2019. The following month, he was named in Papua New Guinea's squad for the 2019 ICC World Cricket League Division Two tournament in Namibia.

In June 2019, he was selected to represent the Papua New Guinea cricket team in the men's tournament at the 2019 Pacific Games. In September 2019, he was named in Papua New Guinea's squad for the 2019 ICC T20 World Cup Qualifier tournament in the United Arab Emirates. He was the leading wicket-taker for Papua New Guinea in the tournament, with twelve dismissals in eight matches.

In August 2021, Ravu was named in Papua New Guinea's squad for the 2021 ICC Men's T20 World Cup.

References

External links
 

1994 births
Living people
Papua New Guinean cricketers
Papua New Guinea One Day International cricketers
Papua New Guinea Twenty20 International cricketers